Tillakaratne Mudiyanselage Nishan Sampath (born June 23, 1982, in Jaffna, Sri Lanka) (born Tuwan Mohammad Nishan Sampath) is a Sri Lankan first class cricketer and brother of Sri Lankan national cricket team player Tillakaratne Dilshan. He studied at the Kalutara Vidyalaya. He made his Twenty20 debut on 17 August 2004, for Bloomfield Cricket and Athletic Club in the 2004 SLC Twenty20 Tournament. In April 2018, he was named in Dambulla's squad for the 2018 Super Provincial One Day Tournament.

In November 2021, he was selected to play for the Colombo Stars following the players' draft for the 2021 Lanka Premier League.

References

External links
 http://www.cricinfo.com/sri-lanka-v-india-2010/content/player/50737.html
 https://cricketarchive.com/Archive/Players/67/67121/67121.html

1982 births
Living people
Basnahira cricketers
Converts to Buddhism from Islam
People from Jaffna
Ruhuna cricketers
Sri Lankan Buddhists
Sri Lankan former Muslims
Sri Lankan Malays
Cricketers at the 2010 Asian Games
Sri Lankan cricketers
Singha Sports Club cricketers
Bloomfield Cricket and Athletic Club cricketers
Badureliya Sports Club cricketers
Tamil Union Cricket and Athletic Club cricketers
Nagenahira Nagas cricketers
Southern Express cricketers
Batticaloa District cricketers
Kandy Falcons cricketers
Asian Games competitors for Sri Lanka